Vital Signs 1 was  the first album of the Pakistani band Vital Signs. Fresh from the success of their smash hit Dil Dil Pakistan Vital Signs went to work on their debut album, with Shoaib Mansoor providing the lyrics to all but 2 songs. Dil Dil Pakistan had unparalleled success, something which no song has ever been able to achieve in Pakistan, on its way to becoming one of the most famous songs ever written.

Rohail Hyatt produced the album, his first shot at music production. He is now known as one of the best Music Producers in Pakistan.

The songs were varied in their arrangements, ranging from rock (Do Pal Ka Jeevan, Chehra) to bubblegum pop (Yaadein). Also included is an Urdu version of Neil Diamond's Red Red Wine with completely unrelated lyrics. Hit songs from the album include Gori and Musafir, which is said to be Junaid Jamshed's best vocal performance ever. The best song on the album is generally thought to be the over 7-minute-long Yeh Shaam, a beautifully written song, featuring a brilliant vocal performance by Junaid Jamshed.

Track listing
All music arranged, composed and produced by Vital Signs. All songs written by Shoaib Mansoor, those which are not are mentioned below.

Personnel
All information is taken from the CD.

Vital Signs
Junaid Jamshed Khan - vocals
Rohail Hyatt - keyboard, backing vocals
Shahzad Hasan - bass guitars
Salman Ahmad - lead guitars

Additional musicians
Guitars on "Dil Dil Pakistan" by Nusrat Hussain

Production
Produced by Rohail Hyatt
Recorded, Mixed & Mastered at EMI Studios in Karachi, Pakistan
Sound engineering by Iqbal Asif
Album art by Jaffar Hussain
Photography by Rooha Gaznavi

External links
Vital Signs - A Personal History by NFP
Vital Signs Album 1

1989 debut albums
Vital Signs (band) albums
Urdu-language albums